József Balázs (born 9 May 1984 in Orosháza) is a retired Hungarian football player.

References
HLSZ 

1984 births
Living people
People from Orosháza
Hungarian footballers
Association football forwards
Mezőkovácsháza TE players
Gyulai Termál FC players
Orosháza FC players
FC Tatabánya players
Kecskeméti TE players
Békéscsaba 1912 Előre footballers
Nemzeti Bajnokság I players
Sportspeople from Békés County